Meinke is a surname. Notable people with the surname include:

Bob Meinke (1887–1952), American baseball player
Frank Meinke (1863–1931), American baseball player
Katrin Meinke (born 1979), German cyclist
Nina Meinke (born 1993), German boxer
Peter Meinke (born 1932), American author